This is a list of conflicts in Africa arranged by country, both on the continent and associated islands, including wars between African nations, civil wars, and wars involving non-African nations that took place within Africa. It encompasses colonial wars, wars of independence, secessionist and separatist conflicts, major episodes of national violence (riots, massacres, etc.), and global conflicts in which Africa was a theatre of war.

African Great Lakes

Burundi
1972 Burundi genocide
October 21, 1993 – August 2005 Burundi Civil War
December 28, 2000 Titanic Express Massacre
September 9, 2002 Itaba Massacre
August 13, 2004 Gatumba Massacre
April 26, 2015 – 17 May 2018 Burundian unrest

Rwanda
October 1, 1990 – July 18, 1994 Rwandan Civil War

April 7, 1994 – July 15, 1994 Rwandan genocide

Kenya
August 3, 1914 – November 1918 East African Campaign (World War I)
June 10, 1940 – November 27, 1941 East African Campaign (World War II)
1952–1960 Mau Mau Uprising
1963–1967 Shifta War
1980 Garissa Massacre
February 10, 1984 Wagalla massacre
1987–1990 Kenyan-Ugandan border conflict
2005 Turbi Village Massacre
2007–2008 Kenyan crisis
2017 2017 Kenyan general election violence

South Sudan
May 26, 2009 – ongoing Sudanese nomadic conflicts
January 7, 2011 – ongoing Ethnic violence in South Sudan
May 19, 2011 – ongoing Sudan–SRF conflict
March 26, 2012 – September 26, 2012 Sudan–South Sudan Border War (Heglig Crisis)
December 15, 2013 – February 22, 2020 South Sudanese Civil War

Tanzania
July 28, 1914 – November 11, 1918 World War I
1964 Zanzibar Revolution
1972 Invasion of Uganda
1978–1979 Uganda–Tanzania War

Uganda
January 25, 1971 Coup d'état
1972 Invasion of Uganda
July 4, 1976 Operation Entebbe
October 30, 1978 – April 11, 1979 Uganda-Tanzania War
April 11, 1979 Fall of Kampala
1980–1985 Uganda National Rescue Front
1982–1986 Ugandan Civil War
1986–1988 Uganda People's Democratic Army
1986–1987 Holy Spirit Movement
1987–1990 Kenyan-Ugandan border conflict
1987–ongoing Lord's Resistance Army
1996–ongoing Allied Democratic Forces
1996–2002 Uganda National Rescue Front II

Central Africa

Cameroon
1804–1808 Fulani War
1835–1836 Fula jihads
July 28, 1914 – November 11, 1918 World War I
September 1, 1939 – September 2, 1945 World War II
July 2 2006 - ongoing Bakassi conflict
March 2014 – ongoing Boko Haram insurgency 
September 9 2017 - ongoing Anglophone Crisis

Central African Republic
1928–1931 Kongo-Wara rebellion
1987–present Lord's Resistance Army insurgency
2004–2007 Central African Republic Bush War
2012–present Central African Republic Civil War
13 April 2013 – 10 January 2014 Central African Republic conflict under the Djotodia administration

Chad

Kanem Empire 
 1203–1243 Dunama Dabbalemi, of the Sayfawa dynasty, mai of the Kanem Empire, declared jihad against the surrounding tribes and initiated an extended period of conquest
c. 1342 - c. 1388 Fall of Kanem
c. 1342 - c. 1352 Sao Resurgence
c. 1376 - c. 1388 Bulala Invasion

French Chad 

 1909-1911 Ouaddai War
 1915 - 15 November 1917 Massacre des coupes-coupes (in Arabic: Kabkab Massacre, مجزرة كبكب)

Republic of Chad 

 1 November 1965 Mangalmé riots
 1965-2010 War in Chad
 1965-2010 Chadian Civil War
 1965-1970 Civil war in Chad
 1979-1982 Civil war in Chad
 1998-2002 Civil war in Chad
 18 December 2005 - 15 January 2010 Civil war in Chad
 18 December 2005 Battle of Adré
 6 January 2006 Borota raid
 6 March 2006 Amdjereme raid
 13 April 2006 Battle of N'Djamena
 1 May 2006 Dalola raid
 2-4 February 2008 Battle of N'Djamena
 18 June 2008 Battle of Am Zoer
 7 May 2009 Battle of Am Dam
 24-28 April 2010 Battle of Tamassi
 1978-1987 Chadian-Libyan conflict
 1983-1984 Operation Manta
 13 February 1986-2014 Opération Épervier
 1986 Tibesti War
 16 December 1986 - 11 September 1987 Toyota War
 11 April 2002 - ongoing Insurgency in the Maghreb

Congo (Republic of)
1665–1709 Kongo Civil War
Republic of the Congo Civil War (1993–94)
1997–1999 Republic of the Congo Civil War (1997–1999)
2016–2017 The Pool War

Congo (Democratic Republic of)

1892–1894 Congo Arab war
1895–1908 Batetela rebellion
28 July 1914 – 11 November 1918 World War I
1 September 1939 – 2 September 1945 World War II
July 5, 1960 – November 25, 1965 Congo Crisis
1964 Simba Rebellion
1960–ongoing Katanga insurgency
March 8, 1977 – May 26, 1977 Shaba I
May 11, 1978 – June 1978 Shaba II
1987–ongoing Lord's Resistance Army insurgency
1996–ongoing ADF insurgency
October 24, 1996 – May 16, 1997 First Congo War
August 2, 1998 – July 18, 2003 Second Congo War
1999–ongoing Ituri Conflict
2004–ongoing Kivu Conflict
2012–2013 M23 rebellion
December 2013 –  2018 Batwa-Luba clashes
8 August 2016 –  2019 Kamwina Nsapu rebellion

São Tomé and Príncipe
February 3, 1953 Batepá Massacre

Horn of Africa

Djibouti
November 1991 – December 1994 Djiboutian Civil War
June 10, 2008 – June 13, 2008 Djiboutian–Eritrean border conflict

Eritrea

Italian Eritrea 

 1895-1896 First Italo-Ethiopia War
 13 January 1895 Battle of Coatit
 3 October 1935 - May 1936 Second Italo-Ethiopian War
 3 October 1935 - December 1935 De Bono's invasion of Abyssinia

Italian East Africa 

 10 June 1940 - 27 November 1941 World War II
 10 June 1940 - 2 May 1945 Mediterranean and Middle East theatre
 10 June 1940 - 27 November 1941 East African Campaign
 5 February 1941 - 1 April 1941 Battle of Keren

Federation of Ethiopia and Eritrea 

 1 September 1961 - 29 May 1991 Eritrean War of Independence
 24 July 1967 - 172 men killed in Hazemo
 1967 - 50 students suspected of being members of the Eritrean Liberation Front (ELF) had been hanged in the centre of Agordat.
 17 January 1970 - 60 village elders in Elabared had been rounded up for supporting the Eritrean Liberation Front and killed.
 30 November 1970 - 121 people in Basik Dera had been rounded up into the local mosque and killed.
 1 December 1970 - Ethiopian Army units surrounded and killed 625 people in Ona, and burned the village down
 28 December 1974 - 45 students in Asmara were strangled to death and their bodies dumped in alleyways and doorsteps
 2 February 1975 - During an engagement with the EPLF and the ELF, the Ethiopian Army attacked the church where 103 villagers in Woki Duba had taken refuge
 14 February 1975 - Ethiopian troops fired on and killed 300-3,000 civilians in Asmara and nearby villages
 9 March 1975 - Ethiopian troops killed 208 civilians in Agordat
 August 1975 - 250 villagers in Om Hajer were machine-gunned in front of a river
 April 1988 - Three killed by aerial attacks in Agordat
 5 December 1988 - 400 killed in She'eb
 3-4 April 1990 - Aerial attacks in Afabet killed 67 and wounded 125
 24 April 1990 - Aerial attacks and cluster bombs in Massawa killed 50 and wounded 110
 1977-1978 Battle of Massawa
 1977 Siege of Barentu
 17-20 March 1988 Battle of Afabet
 8-10 February 1990 Battle of Massawa

Ethiopian Empire 

 February 1972 - 13 October 1974 First Eritrean Civil War

Provisional Military Government of Socialist Ethiopia 

 February 1980 - 24 March 1981 Second Eritrean Civil War

Transitional Government of Ethiopia 

 15-17 December 1995 Hanish Islands conflict

State of Eritrea 

 6 May 1998 - 25 May 2000 Eritrean-Ethiopian War
 10-13 June 2008 Djiboutian-Eritrean border conflict
 1 January 2010 Eritrean-Ethiopian border skirmish

Ethiopia

Axumite Empire 

 c. 300 CE Ezana of Axum is said to have launched several military campaigns and destroyed the Kingdom of Kush
 525 Conquest of the Himyarite Kingdom by Axum
 570-578 Aksumite-Persian wars
 Battle of Hadhramaut
 Siege of Sanaa (570)
 c. 900 King of Aksum Degna Djan led military expeditions as far south as Ennarea
 c. 960 Axumite Empire is said to have been destroyed by Gudit of the Kingdom of Simien

Makhzumi Dynasty 

 c. 1270 Makhzumi Sultan assisted Yekuno Amlak rebellion against Zagwe dynasty
 c. 1285 the Conquest of Makhzumi by the Ifat Sultanate

Ethiopian Empire 

 1314-1344 Conquests of the Emperor Amda Seyon I
 c. 1316 Early military actions
 c. 1316 Emperor Amda Seyon I successfully campaigned against the Muslim kingdoms of Damot and Hadiya
 c. 1320 Rebellion of Haqq ad-Din I
 c. 1329 Northern campaigns
 c. 1332 Later campaigns
 c. 1320-1415 Abyssinian wars against the Sultanate of Ifat
 1529-1543 Ethiopian-Adal War
 March 1529 Battle of Shimbra Kure
 1531 Battle of Antukyah
 28 October 1531 Battle of Amba Sel
 24 April 1541 Battle of Sahart
 2 February 1542 Battle of Baçente
 4-16 April 1542 Battle of Jarte
 August 1542 Battle of the Hill of the Jews
 28 August 1542 Battle of Wofla
 21 February 1543 Battle of Wayna Daga
 1769-1855 Zemene Mesafint
 December 1867 - May 1868 British Expedition to Abyssinia
 12 January 1872 - 10 March 1889 Conquests of Yohannes IV of Ethiopia
 1875-1881 War with Ottoman Egypt
 1885 War with Sudan
 1887 war with Emirate of Harar
 9 January 1887 Battle of Chelenqo
 1881-1899 Mahdist War
 14 October 1888 Battle of Guté Dili
 1895-1896 First Italo-Ethiopia War
 1 March 1896 Battle of Adwa
 7 December 1895 Battle of Amba Alagi
 13 January 1895 Battle of Coatit
 3 October 1935 - May 1936 Second Italo-Ethiopia War
 3 October - December 1935 De Bono's invasion of Abyssinia
 15 December 1935 - 20 January 1936 Ethiopian Christmas Offensive
 12-20 January 1936 Battle of Genale Doria
 20-24 January 1936 First Battle of Tembien
 1-19 February 1936 Battle of Amba Aradam
 27-29 February 1936 Second Battle of Tembien
 29 February - 2 March 1936 Battle of Shire
 31 March 1936 Battle of Maychew
 14-25 April 1936 Battle of the Ogaden
 26 April - 5 May 1936 March of the Iron Will
 1 September 1939 - 2 September 1945 World War II
 10 June 1940 - 2 May 1945 Mediterranean and Middle East theatre
 10 June 1940 - 27 November 1941 East African Campaign

Federation of Ethiopia and Eritrea 

 1 September 1961 - 29 May 1991 Eritrean War of Independence

Ethiopian Empire 

 12 September 1974 - 28 May 1991 Ethiopian Civil War

Provisional Military Government of Socialist Ethiopia 

 13 July 1977 - 15 March 1978 Ethio-Somali War
 June - August 1982 Ethiopian-Somali Border War

Transitional Government of Ethiopia 

 1992 - ongoing Oromo conflict
 1994-2018 Insurgency in Ogaden

Federal Democratic Republic of Ethiopia 

 6 May 1998 - 25 May 2000 Eritrean-Ethiopian War
 7 October 2002 - ongoing Operation Enduring Freedom - Horn of Africa
 4 November 2020 - ongoing Tigray conflict

Somalia

Ajuuraan State 

 1580s Ajuran-Portuguese wars

Italian East Africa 

 10 June 1940 - 27 November 1941 World War II
 10 June 1940 - 2 May 1945 Mediterranean and Middle East theatre
 10 June 1940 - 27 November 1941 East African Campaign
 3-19 August 1940 Italian conquest of British Somaliland

Somali Democratic Republic 

 13 July 1977 - 15 March 1978 Ethio-Somali War
 6 April 1981 - 18 May 1991 Somaliland War of Independence
 June-August 1982 Ethiopian-Somali Border War
 26 January 1991 - ongoing Somali Civil War
 1978 - 1991 Somali Rebellion
 9 December 1992 - 4 May 1993 Unified Task Force
 22 August 1993 - 13 October 1993 Operation Gothic Serpent
 3-4 October 1993 Battle of Mogadishu

Transitional Federal Government 

 26 January 1991 - ongoing Somali Civil War
 4 June - 20 December 2006 Advance of the Islamic Courts Union
 7 May - 11 July 2006 Battle of Mogadishu
 20 December 2006 - 30 January 2009 War in Somalia
 20-26 December 2006 Battle of Baidoa
 23-25 December 2006 Battle of Bandiradley
 24-25 December 2006 Battle of Beledweyne
 27 December 2006 Battle of Jowhar
 28 December 2006 Fall of Mogadishu
 31 December 2006 - 1 January 2007 Battle of Jilib
 1 January 2007 Fall of Kismayo
 5-12 January 2007 Battle of Ras Kamboni
 21 March - 26 April 2007 Battle of Mogadishu
 31 May - 3 June 2007 Battle of Bargal
 8-16 November 2007 Battle of Mogadishu
 19-20 April 2008 Battle of Mogadishu
 1-26 July 2008 Battle of Beledweyne
 8 July 2008 - 26 January 2009 Siege of Baidoa
 20-22 August 2008 Battle of Kismayo
 Piracy in Somalia
 28 March 2006 Action
 3 June 2007 Action
 8 December 2008 - ongoing Operation Atalanta
 16 September 2008 Carré d'As IV incident
 9 April 2009 Raid off Somalia
 8-12 April 2009 Maersk Alabama hijacking
 17 August 2009 - ongoing Operation Ocean Shield
 23 March 2010 Action
 30 March 2010 Action
 5 April 2010 Action
 6 May 2010 MV Moscow University hijacking
 18-21 January 2011 MV Beluga Nomination incident
 16-19 June 2011 Operation Umeed-e-Nuh
 12 January 2012 Attack on Spanish oiler Patiño
 31 January 2009 - ongoing War in Somalia
 22 February 2009 African Union base bombings in Mogadishu
 24-25 February 2009 Battle of South Mogadishu
 7 May - 1 October 2009 Battle of Mogadishu
 11 May - 1 October 2009 Battle for Central Somalia
 5 June 2009 Battle of Wabho
 18 June 2009 Beledweyne bombing
 1-7 October 2009 Battle of Kismayo
 10-14 January 2010 Battle of Beledweyne
 May-July 2010 Ayn clashes
 1 May 2010 Mogadishu bombings
 20 July 2010 Kenya-Al-Shabaab border clash
 8 August - 17 October 2010 Galgala campaign
 23 August 2010 - 6 August 2011 Battle of Mogadishu
 27 April 2011 Battle of Gedo
 4 October 2011 Mogadishu bombing
 16 October 2011 - June 2012 Operation Linda Nchi
 28 September - 1 October 2012 Battle of Kismayo
 11 January 2013 Bulo Marer hostage rescue attempt
 June 2007 - May 2008 Ethiopian crackdown in Ogaden
 7 October 2001 - ongoing War on Terrorism
 7 October 2002 - ongoing Operation Enduring Freedom - Horn of Africa
 18 March 2006 Action
 5-12 January 2007 Battle of Ras Kamboni
 3 June 2007 Action
 31 May - 3 June 2007 Battle of Bargal
 3 March 2008 Dobley airstrike
 1 May 2008 Dhusamareb airstrike
 8-12 April 2009 Maersk Alabama hijacking
 17 August 2009 - ongoing Operation Ocean Shield
 14 September 2009 Baraawe raid
 25 January 2012 Rescue of Jessica Buchanan and Poul Hagen Thisted

Federal Republic of Somalia 

 7 October 2001 - ongoing War on Terrorism
 7 October 2002 - ongoing Operation Enduring Freedom - Horn of Africa
 11 January 2013 Bulo Marer hostage rescue attempt

Somaliland

 1700 BCE Invasion of Ancient Egypt by the Kingdom of Kush and the Land of Punt
1529–1543 Ethiopian-Adal War
1827 Battle of Berbera 1827
1900–1920 Somaliland Campaign
1922 1922 Burao Tax Revolt
June 10, 1940 – November 27, 1941 East African Campaign (World War II)
August 3, 1940 – August 19, 1940 Italian conquest of British Somaliland
July 2, 1945 – July 7, 1945 1945 Sheikh Bashir Rebellion
July 13, 1977 – March 15, 1978 Ethio-Somali War
April 6, 1981 - May 18, 1991 Somaliland War of Independence
1998 - ongoing Puntland-Somaliland dispute

Indian Ocean islands

Comoros
March 25, 2008 – March 27, 2008 Invasion of Anjouan

Madagascar
1883–1885 First Madagascar expedition
1894–1895 Second Madagascar expedition
1942 Battle of Madagascar (World War II)
1947–1948 Madagascar revolt

Mauritius
August 20, 1810 – August 27, 1810 Battle of Grand Port

North Africa

Algeria

264 BCE – 146 BCE Punic Wars
112 BCE – 106 BCE Jugurthine War
420s Vandals conquer the Roman province
June 533 – March 534 Vandalic War
544 – Second Moorish uprising and the revolt of Guntharic
647 – 709 Muslim conquest of the Maghreb
1518 Fall of Tlemcen
1529 Capture of Peñón of Algiers
 September 14, 1769 – May 16, 1772 Danish–Algerian War
1830 – 1847 French conquest of Algeria
1835 – 1903 Pacification of Algeria
June 10, 1940 – May 13, 1943 North African Campaign (World War II)
May 8, 1945 Sétif and Guelma massacre
November 1, 1954 – March 19, 1962 Algerian War
October 1963 Sand War
1970 – ongoing Western Sahara conflict
December 26, 1991 – February 2002 Algerian Civil War
April 11, 2002 – ongoing Insurgency in the Maghreb

Egypt

1803–1807 Muhammad Ali's seizure of power
1881–1899 Mahdist War
June 11, 1940 – February 4, 1943: North African Campaign, part of World War II
October 29 – November 7, 1956 Suez Crisis
June 5, 1967 – June 10, 1967 Six-Day War
July 1, 1967 – August 7, 1970 War of Attrition
October 6, 1973 – October 25, 1973 Yom Kippur War
July 21, 1977 – July 24, 1977 Libyan–Egyptian War
January 25, 2011 – ongoing 2011 Egyptian Revolution and Aftermath
January 25, 2011 – February 11, 2011 Egyptian Revolution
Egyptian crisis (2011–14)
February 23, 2011 – ongoing Sinai insurgency
November 22, 2012 – July 3, 2013 Egyptian protests
June 28, 2013 – July 3, 2013 June 2013 Egyptian protests
July 3, 2013 – ongoing Political violence in Egypt
2013 – ongoing Insurgency in Egypt (2013–present)

Libya

 1279 BC – 1213 BC Ramesses II's Campaigns in Libya
264 BC – 146 BC Punic Wars
112 BC – 106 BC Jugurthine War
420s Vandals conquer the Roman province
June 533 – March 534 Vandalic War
544 Second Moorish uprising and the revolt of Guntharic
647 – 709 Muslim conquest of the Maghreb
Ottoman–Habsburg wars
1551 Siege of Tripoli
1793 – 1795 Tripolitanian civil war
1797 Action of 16 May 1797
1801 – 05 First Barbary War
1825 Sardinian-Tripolitanian war of 1825
1911 – 43 Libyan resistance movement
1911 – 12 Italo-Turkish War
June 11, 1940 – February 4, 1943 Western Desert Campaign, part of World War II
1977 Libyan-Egyptian War
1978 – 87 Chadian-Libyan conflict
August, 1980 Tobruk incident
May 8, 1984 Bab al-Azizia siege
2011 Libyan Civil War
2011 – 2014 Post-civil war violence in Libya
2014 – 2020 Second Libyan Civil War

Morocco

264 BCE – 146 BCE Punic Wars
112 BCE – 106 BCE Jugurthine War
420s Vandals conquer the Roman province
June 533 – March 534 Vandalic War
544 Second Moorish uprising and the revolt of Guntharic
647–709 Muslim conquest of the Maghreb
739–743 Berber Revolt
1130–1147 Almoravid-Almohad War
1215–1269 Almohad-Marinid War
1125–1269 Almohad-Marinid War
1299–1370 Morocco-Tlemcen conflict
1415–1578 Moroccan-Portuguese conflict
1465 Moroccan Revolt
1527–1554 Wattassid-Saadian War
September 1497 Conquest of Melilla
1554–1830 Moroccan-Turkish border conflict
1577 A Moroccan expedition occupied Taghaza
1582 A first expedition to Timbuktu was defeated
1591 A Moroccan expeditionary force defeated the Songhay army at Tondibi and conquered Gao, Timbuktu and Djenné 
1603–1627 War of Succession
1613–1666 Civil War
1844 First Franco-Moroccan War
1859 Spanish-Moroccan War
1893 Rif War
1909 Rif War
1911–1912 Second Franco-Moroccan War
1920–1926 Rif War
1914–1921 Zaian War
1942 North African Campaign
1957–1958 Ifni War
1963 Sand War
1970–ongoing Western Sahara conflict
1975–1991 Western Sahara War
April 11, 2002 – ongoing Insurgency in the Maghreb

Sudan

Nubia 

 c. 3050 BCE Hor-Aha, the second pharaoh of Egypt, led a campaign against the Nubians

Kingdom of Kerma 

 c. 1506 BCE - 1493 BCE During the reign of Thutmose I, the Kingdom of Kerma rebelled against Egyptian rule and Thutmose I traveled up the Nile and fought in the battle, killing the Nubian king.

Egyptian Empire 

 c. 1282 BCE Seti's military campaigns
 c. 1279 BCE - 1213 BCE Remesses II's campaigns in Nubia

Kingdom of Kush 

 23 BCE The Roman prefect of Egypt invaded the Kingdom of Kush after an initial attack by the queen of  Meröe, razing Napata to the ground
 c. 300 CE Ezana of Axum launched several military campaigns, destroying the Kingdom of Kush

Kingdom of Makuria 

 1312 Mamluk Invasion

Sultanate of Darfur 

 1722-1786 Civil War

Egyptian Eyalet 

 February 1820 - October 1822 Invasion of Libya and Sudan

Khedivate of Egypt 

 1899-1901 Rabih War
 1874 Rabih az-Zubayr conquered the Sultanate of Darfur
 1881-1899 The Mahdist War
 3-5 November 1883 Battle of El Obeid
 4-29 February 1884 First and Second Battles of El Teb
 13 March 1884 Battle of Tamai
 13 March 1884 - 26 January 1885 Siege of Khartoum
 17 January 1885 Battle of Abu Klea
 10 February 1885 Battle of Kirbekan
 22 March 1885 Battle of Tofrek
 30 December 1885 Battle of Ginnis
 20 December 1888 Battle of Suakin
 9-10 March 1889 Battle of Gallabat
 17 July 1894 Battle of Kassala
 7 June 1896 Battle of Ferkeh
 8 April 1898 Battle of Atbara
 2 September 1898 Battle of Omdurman
 25 November 1899 Battle of Umm Diwaykarat

Anglo-Egyptian Sudan 

 28 July 1914 - 11 November 1918 World War I
 29 October 1914 - 30 October 1918 Middle Eastern theatre
 1914-1918 North African theatre
 19 November 1915 - February 1917 Senussi Campaign

 1 September 1939 - 2 September 1945 World War II
 10 June 1940 - 2 May 1945 Mediterranean and Middle East theatre
 10 June 1940 - 27 November 27 1941 East African Campaign
 3-19 August 1940 Italian conquest of British Somaliland
 5 February 1941 - 1 April 1941 Battle of Keren
 4-19 May 1941 Battle of Amba Alagi
 13-27 November 1941 Battle of Gondar

Republic of the Sudan 

 18 August 1955 - 27 March 1972 First Sudanese Civil War
 1969-1972 Anyanya rebellion

Democratic Republic of the Sudan 

 1 April 1983 - January 2005 Second Sudanese Civil War

Republic of the Sudan 

 1987 - ongoing Lord's Resistance Army insurgency
 2003 - ongoing War in Darfur
 10-12 May 2008 Attack on Omdurman and Khartoum
 18 December 2005 - 15 January 2010 Chad-Sudan conflict
 27-29 November 2006 Battle of Malakal
 January 2009 - ongoing Sudanese nomadic conflicts
 23 April 2010 South Darfur clash
 7 January 2011 - ongoing South Sudan internal conflict
 19 May 2011 - ongoing Sudan-SRF conflict
 26 March - 26 September 2012 Sudan-South Sudan Border War
 26-28 March 2012 First Battle of Heglig
 17-18 April 2012 Abyei border clash
 15 December 2013 - 22 February 2020 South Sudanese Civil War

Tunisia

Carthaginian Empire 

 264-146 BCE Punic Wars
 264-241 BCE First Punic War
 255 BCE Siege of Aspis
 255 BCE Siege of Adys
 255 BCE Battle of Tunis
 240-238 BCE Mercenary War
 Spring 240 BCE Battle of Utica
 Autumn 240 BCE Battle of the Bagradas River
 Autumn 240 BCE Hamilcar's victory with Navaras
 238 BCE Battle of "The Saw"
 238 BCE Siege of Tunis
 218-201 BCE Second Punic War
 203 BCE Battle of Utica
 203 BCE Battle of the Great Plains
 19 October 202 BCE Battle of Zama
 149-146 BCE Third Punic War
 147 BCE Battle of the Port of Carthage
 147 BCE Battle of Nepheris
 c. 149 BCE - Spring 146 BCE Battle of Carthage

Kingdom of Numidia 

 112-106 BCE Jugurthine War
 111-104 BCE Battle of Thala
 110 BCE Battle of Suthul
 108 BCE Battle of the Muthul

Roman Province of Africa 

 238 CE Battle of Carthage
 439 CE Genseric broke the treaty between the Vandals and the Romans when he invaded the province of Africa Proconsularis and laid siege to Carthage.
 Germanic Wars
 468 CE Battle of Cap Bon

Vandal Kingdom 

 June 533 - Mach 534 Vandalic War
 13 September 533 Battle of Ad Decimum
 15 December 533 Battle of Tricamarum

Byzantine Praetorian Prefecture of Africa 

 The Moorish Wars
 534 First Moorish uprising
 536 Military mutiny
 544 Second Moorish uprising and the revolt of Guntharic
 577 Conflict with Moorish kingdom of Garmul

Byzantine Exarchate of Africa 

 647-709 Muslim conquest of the Maghreb
 698 Battle of Carthage

Aghlabids 

 824-836 Military mutiny
 879-880 Invasion of al-Abbas ibn Ahmad ibn Tulun

Fatimid Caliphate 

 909 Fatimid conquest of Ifriqiya from the Aghlabids
 943-947 Rebellion of Abu Yazid

Almohad Caliphate 

 1160 Ifriqiya conquered and annexed by the Almohads
 1171-1172 Conquest of North Africa and Nubia by the Ayyubid Dynasty

Ayyubid Dynasty 

 1171-1172 Conquest of North Africa and Nubias by the Ayyubid Dynasty

Hafsid Dynasty 

 1269 Eighth Crusade

Ottoman Tunisia 

 1526-1791 Ottoman-Habsburg wars
 16 August 1534 Conquest of Tunis
 June 1535 Conquest of Tunis
 12 July - 13 September 1574 Conquest of Tunis

French Protectorate of Tunisia 

 1 September 1939 - 2 September 1945 World War II
 10 June 1940 - 2 May 1945 Mediterranean and Middle East theatre 
 10 June 1940 - 13 May 1943 North African Campaign
 17 November 1942 - 13 May 1943 Tunisia Campaign
 10 November - 25 December 1942 Run for Tunis
 February - May 1943 Battle of Sedjenane
 14-17 February 1943 Battle of Sidi Bou Zid
 19-25 February 1943 Battle of the Kasserine Pass
 6 March 1943 Battle of Medenine
 16-27 March 1943 Operation Pugilist
 23 March - 3 April 1943 Battle of El Guettar
 5-27 April 1943 Operation Flax
 6-7 April 1943 Battle of Wadi Akarit
 27 April - 1 May 1943 Battle of Hill 609
 6-12 May 1943 Operation Vulcan
 8-13 May 1943 Operation Retribution
 1952-1956 Tunisian Independence

Kingdom of Tunisia 

 1952-1956 Tunisian Independence

Republic of Tunisia 

 19-23 July 1961 Bizerte Crisis
 18 December 2010 - 14 January 2011 Tunisian Revolution
 26 June 2015 - ongoing ISIL insurgency in Tunisia

Southern Africa

Angola
February 4, 1961 – April 25, 1974 Angolan War of Independence
November 11, 1975 – April 4, 2002 Angolan Civil War

Lesotho
1880–1881 Gun War
22 September 1998 – May 1999 South African intervention in Lesotho

Malawi
August 3, 1914 – November 1918 World War I

Mozambique
July 28, 1914 – November 11, 1918 World War I
September 25, 1964 – September 8, 1974 Mozambican War of Independence
May 30, 1977 – October 4, 1992 Mozambican Civil War
2013–2014 Internal conflict in Mozambique
October 5, 2017 – ongoing Insurgency in Cabo Delgado

Namibia
1904–1907 Herero Genocide
July 28, 1914 – November 11, 1918 World War I
September 15, 1914 – February 4, 1915 Maritz Rebellion
August 26, 1966 – March 21, 1990 Namibian War of Independence
1994–1999 Caprivi conflict

South Africa
May 18, 1803 – November 20, 1815 Napoleonic Wars
1817–1819 Ndwandwe–Zulu War
1830s–1840s Great Trek
February 17, 1838 Weenen Massacre
January 11, 1879 – July 4, 1879 Anglo-Zulu War
1779–1879 Xhosa Wars
December 20, 1880 – March 23, 1881 First Boer War
October 11, 1899 – May 31, 1902 Second Boer War
July 28, 1914 – November 11, 1918 World War I
September 15, 1914 – February 4, 1915 Maritz Rebellion
September 4, 1939 – May 7, 1945 World War II
March 21, 1960 Sharpeville Massacre
August 26, 1966 – March 21, 1990 South African Border War
June 16, 1976 Soweto Uprising

Eswatini
October 11, 1899 – May 31, 1902 Second Boer War

Zambia
July 28, 1914 – November 11, 1918 World War I
September 1, 1939 – September 2, 1945 World War II

Zimbabwe
October 1893 – January 1894 First Matabele War
March 1896 – October 1897 Matabele and Mashona 'Revolts' Second Matabele War
July 4, 1964 – December 12, 1979 Second Chimurenga/Rhodesian Bush War
1982 – 1987 Gukurahundi genocide

West Africa

Benin
1724–1727 Abomey (Dahomey) conquests
1726–1730 First Oyo-Dahomey War
1738–1748 Second Oyo-Dahomey War
1764 Second Ashanti-Akim War
1768 Yoruba-Ashanti War
1889–1894 France conquers Dahomey

Burkina Faso
1985 Agacher Strip War
2015 – present Jihadist insurgency in Burkina Faso

Côte d'Ivoire
1883–1898 Mandingo Wars
September 19, 2002 – March 4, 2007 First Ivorian Civil War
28 November 2010 – 11 April 2011 Second Ivorian Civil War

Gambia
2016–2017 2016–2017 Gambian constitutional crisis
2017 – ECOWAS intervention in the Gambia (2017)

Ghana

1620–1654 Dutch–Portuguese War
1664–1665 Anglo-Dutch Wars
1823–1831 Anglo-Ashanti wars
1900 War of the Golden Stool
1948 Accra Riots

Guinea
2013 Guinea clashes

Guinea-Bissau
1962–1974 Guinea-Bissau War of Independence
1997–1999 Guinea-Bissau Civil War

Liberia
1989–1996 First Liberian Civil War
1999–2003 Second Liberian Civil War

Mali

647–709 Muslim conquest of the Maghreb
1075 Almoravid conquest of the Ghana Empire
 1230–1250 Early imperial expansion of the Mali Empire
1400 The Sandaki usurpation and second Mossi raid
1433 The Tuareg invasion
 1460s Songhai conquered Mema
1810–1818 Mopti Jihad
1848–1864 Initial conquests of El Hadj Umar Tall Jihad
1883–1886 Mandingo Wars
1962–1964 First Tuareg rebellion
1985 Agacher Strip War
1990–1995 Azawad insurgency and Malian civil war
April 11, 2002 – ongoing Insurgency in the Maghreb
2007–2009 Second Tuareg rebellion
2012 – Third Tuareg Rebellion
2012 – ongoing Northern Mali conflict
2020 Coup d'état

Mauritania

1970–ongoing Western Sahara conflict
April 11, 2002 – ongoing Insurgency in the Maghreb

Niger
1516–1517 Songhai Civil War
1916–1917 Kaocen Revolt
1990–1995 First Azawad insurgency
April 11, 2002 – ongoing Insurgency in the Maghreb
2007–2009 Second Azawad insurgency
2012 Tuareg Rebellion

Nigeria
1578–1608 Oyo-Benin War
1804–1808 Fulani War
1835–1836 Fula jihads
1873 – Rafin Jaki Jihad
1897 Benin Expedition
1953–ongoing Religious violence in Nigeria
1967–1970 Nigerian Civil War
1998–ongoing Communal conflicts in Nigeria (1998-present)
1999–ongoing Nigerian Sharia conflict
2009–ongoing Niger Delta conflict (2004–present)
2009–ongoing Boko Haram insurgency
2020 The End SARS Massacre

Sierra Leone
February 7, 1813 Action
1982 Ndogboyosoi War
March 23, 1991 – January 18, 2002 Sierra Leone Civil War

Western Sahara
October 23, 1957 – June 30, 1958 Ifni War
1970–ongoing Western Sahara conflict
October 30, 1975 – September 6, 1991 Western Sahara War

Chronological list of wars

19th century 
 1801-1807 Temne War
1801-1805 First Barbary War
1803-1805 Napoleonic Wars
1803-1806 War of the Third Coalition
1806 Battle of Blaauwberg
1807-1809 Anglo-Turkish War
1807 Alexandria expedition
1804-1808 Fulani War
1805-1811 Muhammad Ali's seizure of power
1806-1807 Ashanti–Fante War
1807-1818 Mtetwa Empire Expansion
1810-1818 Amadu's Jihad
1811-1812 Fourth Xhosa War
1811 Ga–Fante War
c.1812 Battle of Shela
1814-1816 Ashanti–Akim–Akwapim War
1815 Slachter's Nek Rebellion
1815 Second Barbary War
1817-1819 Ndwandwe–Zulu War
1818-1819 Fifth Xhosa War
1818-1828 Zulu wars of conquest
1st March 1896 Battle of Adwa

20th century 

 1900 War of the Golden Stool
 1900-1920 Somaliland Campaign
1901-1901 French conquest of the Dendi Kingdom
1902-1904 Kuanhama Rebellion
 1901-1902 Anglo-Aro War
1901-1903 Mapondera Rebellion
 1902-1904 Bailundo revolt of 1902
1903-1904 British conquest of the Sokoto Caliphate
 1904-1908 Herero Wars
1904-1905 uprising in Madagascar
 1905-1907 Maji Maji Rebellion
 1906 Bambatha Rebellion
1906 Sokoto Uprising of 1906
1907-1910 Dembos War of 1907-1910
1908 Battle of Marrakech
 1909 Second Melillan campaign
 1909-1911 Ouaddai War
1910-1912 Portuguese conquest of the Kasanje Kingdom
 1911-1912 French conquest of Morocco
1911-1912 Italo-Turkish War
1912 Sirte revolt
1914 Kolongongo War
1914-1917 Kongo revolt
1914-1921 Zaian War
 1914-1918 African theatre of World War I
1914-1918 East African campaign
1914-1916 Kamerun campaign
1914 Togoland Campaign
1914-1915 South West Africa campaign
 1914-1915 Maritz rebellion
 1915-1916 Volta-Bani War
1915 Chilembwe uprising
 1915 The Bussa rebellion
 1915-1917 Senussi Campaign
 1916-1917 Kaocen revolt
 1916 Battle of Segale
 1918 The Adubi War
1920 Misurata-Warfalla War
 1920-1922 Jabal al-Gharbi civil war
1920-1926 Rif War
 1921-1922 Rand Rebellion
 1922 Bondelswarts Rebellion
 1923-1932 Pacification of Libya
 1928-1931 Kongo-Wara rebellion
 1929-1930 Women's War

1930 Gugsa Wale's rebellion
1935-1937 Second Italo-Ethiopian War
1939-1945 World War II
1940-1943 North African campaign
1940-1943 East African campaign
1940 Battle of Dakar
1940 Battle of Gabon
1942 Battle of Madagascar
1943 Woyane rebellion
1952-1960 Mau Mau Uprising
1954-1962 Algerian War
1955-1964 Bamileke War
1955-1972 First Sudanese Civil War
1957-1958 Ifni War
1960-1965 Congo Crisis
1966-1967 Stanleyville mutinies
1960–present Katanga insurgency
1961 Bizerte crisis
1961-1991 Eritrean War of Independence
1961-1974 Portuguese Colonial War
1961-1974 Angolan War of Independence
1963-1974 Guinea-Bissau War of Independence
1964-1974 Mozambican War of Independence
1962-1964 Tuareg rebellion
1963 Sand War
1963-1967 Shifta War
1963-1970 Bale revolt
1964 Ethiopian–Somali Border War
1964-1965 Simba rebellion
1964-1979 Rhodesian Bush War
1964 Zanzibar Revolution
1965-1979 First Chadian Civil War
1966-1989 South African Border War
1967-1970 Nigerian Civil War
1970–present Western Sahara conflict
1975-1991 Western Sahara War
1972-1974 First Eritrean Civil War
1973–2018 Oromo conflict
1974-1991 Ethiopian Civil War
1975-2002 Angolan Civil War
1975–present Cabinda War
1977-1992 Mozambican Civil War
1977 Libyan–Egyptian War
1977-1978 Ogaden War
1977 Shaba I
1978 Shaba II
1978-1979 Uganda–Tanzania War
1978-1987 Chadian–Libyan conflict
1980-1981 Second Eritrean Civil War
1980-1986 Ugandan Bush War
1981 Entumbane uprising
1981 Gambian coup d'état attempt
1982–present Casamance conflict
1982 Ndogboyosoi War
1982 Ethiopian–Somali Border War
1983-2005 Second Sudanese Civil War
1985 Agacher Strip War
1986 United States bombing of Libya
1987–present Lord's Resistance Army insurgency
1989-1991 Mauritania–Senegal Border War
1989-1997 First Liberian Civil War
1990-1994 Rwandan Civil War
1990-1995 Tuareg rebellion
1991-1994 Djiboutian Civil War
1991-2002 Sierra Leone Civil War
1991-2002 Algerian Civil War
1991–present Somali Civil War
1993-2005 Burundian Civil War
1993-1994 Republic of the Congo Civil War
1994 Bophuthatswana crisis
1994-1999 Caprivi conflict
1994–2018 Insurgency in Ogaden
1995–2018 Second Afar insurgency
1995 Hanish Islands conflict
1996–present Allied Democratic Forces insurgency
1996-1997 First Congo War
1997-1999 Republic of the Congo Civil War
1998-2000 Eritrean–Ethiopian War
1998-2003 Second Congo War
2000 Six-Day War
1998-1999 Guinea-Bissau Civil War
1999-2003 Second Liberian Civil War
1999–present Ituri conflict

21st century
2001–present War on Terrorism
1997–present Islamic Terrorism in Egypt
2002–present Islamic insurgency in the Maghreb
2002–present Operation Enduring Freedom - Horn of Africa
2006 Rise of the Islamic Courts Union
2006–2009 Ethiopian War in Somalia
2007–present Operation Enduring Freedom - Trans Sahara
2009–present Islamist civil war in Somalia
2009 Nigerian sectarian violence
2015–present ISIL insurgency in Tunisia
2017–present Islamist insurgency in Mozambique
2002-2003 Conflict in the Pool Department
2002–2004 First Ivorian Civil War
2003–present War in Darfur
2004 French–Ivorian clashes
2004–present Conflict in the Niger Delta
2016–present Niger Delta conflict
2004–2007 Central African Republic Bush War
2004–present Kivu conflict
2005–2010 Chadian Civil War
2005–2008 Mount Elgon insurgency
2006-2013 Bakassi conflict
2007–2009 Second Tuareg Rebellion
2007–2008 Kenyan crisis
2008 Invasion of Anjouan
2008 Kufra conflict
2008 Djiboutian–Eritrean border conflict
2009–present Sudanese nomadic conflicts
2011–present Ethnic violence in South Sudan
2013–2020 South Sudanese Civil War
2009 Sudan airstrikes
2009 Dongo conflict
2011 Second Ivorian Civil War
2011 First Libyan Civil War
2011–present Sudanese conflict in South Kordofan and Blue Nile
2011-2014 Factional violence in Libya
2012–present Mali War
2012 Heglig Crisis
2012-2013 M23 rebellion
2012 Baragoi clashes
2012–present Central African Republic Civil War
2013–present Batwa–Luba clashes
2013-2019 RENAMO insurgency
2014 Aswan tribal clashes
2014–2020 Second Libyan Civil War
2016-2017 Pool War
2016 Kasese clashes
2016–2019 Kamwina Nsapu rebellion
2017–present Anglophone Crisis
2020–present Tigray War

See also
List of active separatist movements in Africa
Military history of Africa

General:
List of conflicts in North America
List of conflicts in Central America
List of conflicts in South America
List of conflicts in Europe
List of conflicts in Asia
List of conflicts in the Near East
List of modern conflicts in the Middle East
List of wars

References

Further reading
 Ahram, Ariel I. War and Conflict in the Middle East and North Africa (John Wiley & Sons, 2020).
 Christman, Audrey Mona. Civil wars in Africa: Roots and resolution (McGill-Queen's Press-MQUP, 1999).

 Kalu, Kelechi A. ed. Civil Wars in Africa (2022) excerpt

 Sidorova, Galina, and Eliza Lyubenova. "Contemporary Wars in Africa or 21st Century Competition for Power." Journal of Asian and African Studies (2020): 0021909620965609.
 Williams, Paul D. War and conflict in Africa (John Wiley & Sons, 2016).

Africa
Wars involving the states and peoples of Africa
Conflicts